The National Software Centre (NSC) is based in Mahon, Cork (city) and was built under an Irish Government initiative to establish a centre of excellence for the SMART economy. The project is a privately led venture via a public–private partnership.

The NSC Campus hosts the Network Operations Centre in Cork for the 60 km Cork (city) MAN (48/96 pair fibre ring Metropolitan Area Network) which launched in January 2004.

References 

Information technology institutes
Buildings and structures in Cork (city)